) or  is a surname.

Geographical distribution
As of 2014, 70.1% of all known bearers of the surname Blomqvist were residents of Sweden (frequency 1:1,099), 25.2% of Finland (1:1,704), 1.1% of Norway (1:36,471) and 1.0% of Estonia (1:10,745).

In Sweden, the frequency of the surname was higher than national average (1:1,099) in the following counties:
 1. Södermanland County (1:721)
 2. Jönköping County (1:741)
 3. Kalmar County (1:772)
 4. Dalarna County (1:828)
 5. Norrbotten County (1:919)
 6. Uppsala County (1:969)
 7. Kronoberg County (1:981)
 8. Blekinge County (1:993)
 9. Stockholm County (1:1,030)
 10. Västmanland County (1:1,054)

In Finland, the frequency of the surname was higher than national average (1:1,704) in the following regions:
 1. Åland (1:168)
 2. Ostrobothnia (1:384)
 3. Southwest Finland (1:820)
 4. Uusimaa (1:1,068)
 5. Central Ostrobothnia (1:1,194)

People
 Andreas Blomqvist, Swedish heavy metal bassist
 Andreas Blomqvist (footballer), Swedish footballer
 Anna-Lena Blomkvist, Swedish politician
 Anni Blomqvist, Finland-Swedish novelist
 Axel Blomqvist, former Swedish speed skater
 Cecilia Blomqvist, Finnish deaconess
 Christina Blomqvist, Swedish orienteering competitor
 Elisabeth Blomqvist, Finnish educator
 Erik Blomqvist (athlete), former Swedish Olympic track and field athlete
 Erik Blomqvist (sport shooter), former Swedish sport shooter
 Erik Blomqvist (chess player), Swedish chess grandmaster
 Jacob Blomqvist, Swedish ice hockey player
 Jesper Blomqvist, Swedish football player and coach
 Johan Blomqvist, bassist of Swedish band Backyard Babies
 Kalle Blomkvist, fictional character created by Astrid Lindgren
 Lena Blomkvist, Swedish football defender
 Mikael Blomkvist, fictional character who appears in Millennium Trilogy.
 Minea Blomqvist, Finnish professional golfer
 Olov Blomkvist, Swedish architect
 Ossi Blomqvist, former Finnish speed skater
 Stig Blomqvist, Swedish rally driver
 Timo Blomqvist, Finnish ice hockey player
 Tom Blomqvist, British racing driver
 Treva Blomquist, singer/songwriter, vocalist, guitarist, Chehalis, Wa, U.S.A.

See also 

 Blomquist
 Bloomquist

References

Swedish-language surnames